Elinor Jane Barker  (born 7 September 1994) is a Welsh road and track racing cyclist, who last rode professionally on the road for UCI Women's Team . Representing Great Britain in international competitions, Barker is an Olympic champion, a two-time World champion and seven-time European champion in the team pursuit, as well as a three-time World champion in the points and scratch races, a two-time European Madison champion and one time European Elimination race champion. Representing Wales, Barker was also the 2018 Commonwealth Games Points race champion. 

Barker was appointed Member of the Order of the British Empire (MBE) in the 2017 New Year Honours for services to cycling.

She is the older sister of fellow international cyclist Megan Barker.

Career

Early life
Elinor Jane Barker from Heath, Cardiff, is the daughter of Graham Barker, deputy headteacher at St Julian's Comprehensive School in Newport. She has two older siblings, Joe and Harri and a sister, Megan, three years her junior and also a successful racing cyclist. She attended Llanishen High School.

Junior career
Barker took up cycling with the Maindy Flyers at the age of 10, as a way of getting out of swimming classes.Taking the title at the British National Track Championships, Barker broke the under-16 British record in the pursuit, previously held by Nicole Cooke. She was recruited into British Cycling's Olympic Development Academy, but remained based in Wales until she completed her A-levels in 2013, after which she moved to Manchester to train full-time at Manchester Velodrome.

She became the Junior Time Trial world champion in 2012, completing the  course in Valkenburg, Netherlands in 22 minutes and 26.29 seconds, beating Cecilie Uttrup Ludwig of Denmark by 35.87 seconds. Subsequently, Barker was named Carwyn James Junior Sportswoman of the Year at the BBC Wales Sports Personality of the Year awards in 2012.

Professional career
In 2013, she became a senior world champion for the first time as a member of the team pursuit squad at the UCI Track World Championships.

Barker represented Wales at the Commonwealth Games in Glasgow, 2014, winning silver and bronze medals.

In September 2014 it was announced that Barker would follow in the footsteps of teammate Laura Trott and join the  team for 2015.

At her home world championships in London, Barker was part of the pursuit team along with Ciara Horne, Joanna Rowsell Shand and Trott to claim the bronze medal; after a disappointing qualifying ride. At the 2016 Olympic Games, Barker along with Katie Archibald, Rowsell Shand and Trott claimed the gold medal in the team pursuit in a world record time of four minutes and 10.236 seconds.

Returning to the track after the Olympics, Barker claimed the silver medal at the European Championships. Barker followed this by winning the points race at the world cup in Apeldoorn. Barker then claimed the title at the Six Days of Amsterdam. Barker closed 2016 with success in the national Madison championships alongside Laura Kenny. Starting 2017 Barker finished second in the ominium event and third in the scratch race at the national championships. Barker finished an impressive third in the points race at the world cup event in Los Angeles, despite having just 15 minutes rest after the Madison event. At the Six days series final, despite not winning a race in Mallorca, Barker won the title. At the World Championships, Barker claimed two silver medals, one in the scratch race and the other in the Madison alongside Emily Nelson. Barker went on to win her first individual world title in the points race.

For the 2018 season Barker decided to join , and joined  for 2019, after  folded.

At the 2018 Commonwealth Games on the Gold Coast, Australia, Barker took the gold in the points race for Wales, ahead of Scots Katie Archibald and Neah Evans. Barker's win was the first Commonwealth Games title for a Welsh track cyclist since 1990. Later that year she was part of the Team GB squad that took the gold in the team pursuit at the European Track Championships on home ground in Glasgow. At the 2019 Track Cycling World Championships in Pruszków, Barker won the rainbow jersey in the scratch race, her first world title in that discipline.

At the 2020 Track Cycling World Championships in Berlin, Barker won the gold in the points race on the final day of the championships, taking Team GB's only title of the meeting. She was also part of the team that took silver in the team pursuit. Later that year Barker took two titles at the European Track Championships, one as part of the team pursuit squad alongside Katie Archibald, Neah Evans, Laura Kenny and Josie Knight, and an individual gold in the elimination race.

In 2021, Barker was part of the British team that won silver in the women's team pursuit at the delayed Tokyo 2020 Olympics. During the Games she signed a two-year deal to join the Uno-X team from 2022.

Personal life 
Barker revealed in 2019 that she was suffering from endometriosis, which nearly caused her to retire, as well as potentially affecting her chances of having a child. In October 2021 Barker announced that she was pregnant, and had been so when she competed in the Tokyo 2020 Olympics.

Major results

Track

2011
 National Junior Championships
1st  Individual pursuit
2nd  Scratch race
 2nd  Individual pursuit, UEC European Junior Championships
2012
 UEC European Junior Championships
1st  Individual pursuit
1st  Team pursuit (with Lucy Garner and Amy Roberts)
 2nd  Team pursuit, 2012–13 UCI World Cup, Cali
 UCI Junior World Championships
2nd  Omnium
2nd  Individual pursuit
3rd  Team pursuit
2013
 1st  Team pursuit, UCI World Championships
 1st  Team pursuit, UEC European Championships
 UEC European Under-23 Championships
2nd  Individual pursuit
2nd  Points race
 3rd  Team pursuit, 2012–13 UCI World Cup, Aguascalientes
2014
 1st  Team pursuit, UCI World Championships
 2014–15 UCI World Cup
1st  Team pursuit, Guadalajara
1st  Team pursuit, London
3rd  Points race, London
 1st  Team pursuit, UEC European Championships
 Revolution
1st Scratch Race – Round 3, Manchester
2nd Points Race – Round 2, Manchester
3rd Points Race – Round 3, Manchester
3rd Scratch Race – Round 4, Manchester
 1st  Team pursuit, National Championships (With Dani King, Joanna Rowsell and Laura Trott)
 Commonwealth Games
2nd  Points race
3rd  Scratch race
2015
 1st  Team pursuit, UEC European Championships
Revolution
1st Points Race – Round 6, Manchester
1st Scratch Race – Round 3, Manchester
2nd Points Race – Round 3, Manchester
 2nd  Team pursuit, UCI World Championships
 3rd  Team pursuit, 2015–16 UCI World Cup, Cali
2016
 1st  Team pursuit, Olympic Games
 2016–17 UCI World Cup
1st  Points race, Apeldoorn
2nd  Team pursuit, Hong Kong
 1st Omnium, Six Days of Amsterdam
 1st  Madison, National Championships (with Laura Kenny)
 2nd  Scratch race, UEC European Championships
Revolution Series
2nd Points Race – Round 1, Manchester
2nd Points Race – Round 5, Manchester
Revolution Champions League
2nd Points Race, Round 2 – London
3rd Omnium, Round 1 – Manchester
3rd Points Race, Round 1 – Manchester
3rd Scratch Race, Round 2 – London
 3rd  Team pursuit, UCI World Championships
2017
 UCI World Championships
1st  Points race
2nd  Scratch race
2nd  Madison (with Emily Nelson)
 UEC European Championships
1st  Madison (with Ellie Dickinson)
2nd  Team pursuit
 2017–18 UCI World Cup
1st Madison, Manchester
1st Team Pursuit, Manchester
2nd  Madison, Pruszków (with Emily Nelson)
 1st Omnium, Six Day Final, Mallorca
 National Track Championships
2nd  Omnium
3rd  Scratch race
 3rd Scratch Race, Revolution Series – Champions League – Round 1, London
2018
 1st  Team pursuit, UEC European Track Championships
 1st  Points race, Commonwealth Games
 1st  Madison, National Championships (with Katie Archibald)
 2nd Scratch Race, Revolution Series – Champions League – Round 3, Manchester
2019
 1st  Scratch race, UCI World Championships
2020
 1st  Points race, UCI World Championships
 UEC European Track Championships
1st  Elimination race
1st  Team pursuit (with Katie Archibald, Neah Evans, Laura Kenny and Josie Knight)
2021
 2nd  Team pursuit, Olympic Games

Road

2011
 1st Stratford-upon-Avon Team Series
 1st Stage 1 Essex Giro
 2nd  Time trial, UCI World Junior Championships
2012
 1st Jubilee Road Race
 1st Duncan Murray Wines Road Race
 1st  Time trial, UCI World Junior Championships
 2nd Hillingdon Grand Prix
 2nd Overall 2 Days of Bedford
1st Stage 4
2013
 1st Otley Grand Prix
2014
 4th Time trial, National Road Championships
2017
 1st  Overall Rás na mBan
1st Queen of the Hills classification
1st Stages 3 & 4
 3rd Ljubljana–Domžale–Ljubljana TT
 National Road Championships
4th Road race
5th Time trial
 7th Overall BeNe Ladies Tour
1st Stage 2a

References

External links

1994 births
Living people
Sportspeople from Cardiff
Welsh female cyclists
Medalists at the 2016 Summer Olympics
Cyclists at the 2014 Commonwealth Games
Commonwealth Games silver medallists for Wales
Commonwealth Games bronze medallists for Wales
UCI Track Cycling World Champions (women)
Cyclists at the 2016 Summer Olympics
Cyclists at the 2020 Summer Olympics
Olympic cyclists of Great Britain
Olympic gold medallists for Great Britain
Olympic silver medallists for Great Britain
Olympic medalists in cycling
Commonwealth Games medallists in cycling
Members of the Order of the British Empire
Welsh Olympic medallists
People educated at Llanishen High School
Welsh track cyclists
European Championships (multi-sport event) gold medalists
Medalists at the 2020 Summer Olympics
Medallists at the 2014 Commonwealth Games
People with Endometriosis